Samuel G. Freedman is an American author and journalist and currently a professor at the Columbia University Graduate School of Journalism.

He has authored six nonfiction books, including Who She Was:  A Son's Search for His Mother's Life, a book about his mother's life as a teenager and young woman, and Letters to a Young Journalist.

Freedman has won the National Jewish Book Award in 2000 in the Non-Fiction category for Jew vs. Jew: The Struggle for the Soul of American Jewry. His book The Inheritance: How Three Families Moved from Roosevelt to Reagan and Beyond was a finalist for the 1997 Pulitzer Prize. His latest book, Breaking the Line: The Season in Black College Football That Transformed the Sport and Changed the Course of Civil Rights, was published in New York, in August 2013 by Simon & Schuster.

Freedman currently writes the "On Religion" column in The New York Times and formerly wrote The Jerusalem Post column "In the Diaspora."

Biography
Born on October 3, 1955 in Lenox Hill Hospital in New York, Freedman was raised in Highland Park, New Jersey, along with his younger brother and sister. His father, David Freedman co-founded the life science company New Brunswick Scientific (now a subsidiary of Eppendorf). His mother, Eleanor (née Hatkin) was the subject of his book, Who She Was.

A paper boy in his youth, Freedman went on to attend the University of Wisconsin–Madison after graduating Highland Park High School in 1973. After receiving his bachelor's degree in journalism and history in 1977, Freedman went on to work at the now-defunct subsidiary of the Chicago Tribune, the Suburban Trib.

Before publishing his first book, Small Victories: The Real World of a Teacher, Her Students, and Their High School, and gaining his professorship at Columbia University, Freedman was a staff reporter for the Culture section of The New York Times.

"There are very few journalists in Sam Freedman's league," notes novelist Robert O'Brian. "His empathy, his intellect, his discipline, experience, and warmth, are immediately apparent even to the casual reader."

Freedman served as a judge for the 2019 and 2020 American Mosaic Journalism Prize.

His brother is Ken Freedman, General Manager of radio station WFMU. His sister is Carol, founder of Carol's Creative Chocolatez.

Works 

Small Victories:  The Real World of a Teacher, Her Students, and Their High School, New York:  Harper and Row (1990)
Upon This Rock:  The Miracles of a Black Church, New York:  HarperCollins (1993)
The Inheritance:  How Three Families Moved from Roosevelt to Reagan and Beyond, New York:  Simon & Schuster (1996)
Jew vs. Jew:  The Struggle for the Soul of American Jewry, New York:  Simon & Schuster (2000)
Who She Was:  A Son's Search for His Mother's Life, New York:  Simon & Schuster (2005)
Letters to a Young Journalist, New York:  Basic Books (2006, revised and updated in 2011) 
Breaking the Line:  The Season in Black College Football That Transformed the Sport and Changed the Course of Civil Rights, New York:  Simon & Schuster (2013)

Views 
Freedman has described white identity as "a source of power and privilege", that has been utilized historically in the US in "opposition to black progress" (commonly called white backlash). He has also suggested that Donald Trump's administration has used the conservative movement and Republicanism as a vehicle for white identity.

References

External links 
 Official web site
 Columbia Graduate School of Journalism
 Author Page on Amazon

American male journalists
Columbia University faculty
The New York Times columnists
Jewish American journalists
Highland Park High School (New Jersey) alumni
People from Highland Park, New Jersey
Living people
1955 births
University of Wisconsin–Madison School of Journalism & Mass Communication alumni
Writers from New Jersey
21st-century American Jews